Giuseppe Rinaldi (14 September 1919 – 15 December 2007) was an Italian actor and voice actor.

Biography
Rinaldi appeared in more than 20 films between 1939 and 1982. During his time, he was considered of be one of the most greatest and influential actors and dubbers in Italy. He was the official Italian voice of Marlon Brando, Jack Lemmon, Rock Hudson and Paul Newman. Other actors Rinaldi occasionally dubbed included Peter Sellers, Van Johnson, Frank Sinatra, Glenn Ford, David Tomlinson, Richard Burton, George Peppard, Burt Lancaster, Charles Bronson, Kirk Douglas, Gregory Peck, Roger Moore, Jeffrey Hunter, Max von Sydow, James Dean, Peter O'Toole, William Holden, Christopher Plummer, Michael Caine and Charlton Heston.

In Rinaldi's animated film roles, he voiced Pongo in the Italian dub of the 1961 animated film One Hundred and One Dalmatians as well as Prince Charming in the Italian version of Cinderella. Other animated dubbing roles included Jim Dear in Lady and the Tramp, The Great Prince of the Forest in the 1968 redub of Bambi and Dallben in The Black Cauldron.

Personal life
Rinaldi was once married to actress Marina Dolfin. They had two children together; Massimo and Antonella. From his second marriage to actress Maria-Pia Casilio, they had one daughter; Francesca. All three of his children are voice actors.

Rinaldi died on 15 December 2007 at the age of 88. He had retired from his career 10 years earlier.

Selected filmography

Cinema
 Department Store (1939)
 The First Woman Who Passes (1940)
 Then We'll Get a Divorce (1940)
 The Cavalier from Kruja (1940)
 The Man on the Street  (1941)
 The Prisoner of Santa Cruz (1941)
 Forbidden Music (1942)
 Disturbance (1942)
 Farewell Love! (1943)
 Romulus and the Sabines (1945)
 Immigrants (1948)
 Night Taxi (1950)
 A Pocketful of Chestnuts (1970)

Dubbing roles

Animation
Pongo in One Hundred and One Dalmatians
Prince Charming in Cinderella
Jim Dear in Lady and the Tramp
Dallben in The Black Cauldron
The Great Prince of the Forest in Bambi (1968 redub)
Captain Hook in Peter Pan (1986 redub)
Prince Amat in Alakazam the Great

References

External links

 
 

1919 births
2007 deaths
Italian male film actors
Italian male radio actors
Italian male voice actors
Italian voice directors
Male actors from Rome
20th-century Italian male actors